FC Dürrenast  is a football team from Thun, Switzerland.  The team currently plays in the Bern/Jura regional competition of the Swiss football pyramid.

References

External links
Official Website 

Association football clubs established in 1927
Durrenast
1927 establishments in Switzerland